Jurassic 5 is an American alternative hip hop group formed in 1994 by rappers Charles Stewart (Chali 2na), Dante Givens (Akil), Courtenay Henderson (Soup aka Zaakir), Marc Stuart (Marc 7); and disc jockeys Mark Potsic (DJ Nu-Mark) and Lucas Macfadden (Cut Chemist). 
The six piece crew that was formed, came out of the Los Angeles venue Good Life.
The group broke up in 2007,
shortly after releasing their fourth LP Feedback, citing "musical differences," but returned to the stage in 2013 and released a new track in 2014. The members have continued to release music individually.

History
Jurassic 5 debuted nationally in 1995 from TVT Records with their first single, "Unified Rebelution". Jurassic 5 released their first record, Jurassic 5 EP, in 1997. 
After Jurassic 5 put out their first record, it "cemented their position in the 1990s alternative hip hop movement, alongside artists such as Company Flow, Black Star and Kool Keith."  The group later signed to Interscope Records and the EP was repackaged with additional tracks and released in December 1998 as the full-length, eponymous debut album entitled Jurassic 5. In a 2002 interview with The Sydney Morning Herald, the group explained the origin of their name. Chali 2na revealed, "I played the song to my friend’s mother and she made a joke: ‘You guys think you sound like the Fantastic Five, but you sound more like the Jurassic Five.’ And we started laughing but, well, the name stuck."

This was followed by their second album Quality Control, which peaked at #43 on the Billboard 200.

In 2002, they released their third album, Power In Numbers which peaked at #15 on the Billboard 200 chart.

Jurassic 5 eventually toured without Cut Chemist, who left the group to pursue a solo career. The remaining five members released their fourth and final album, Feedback, on July 25, 2006. The album peaked at #15 on the Billboard 200.

The group split in 2007. Reasons for the break-up were attributed to disagreements among members of the group.

In 2013, the group re-formed, including the return of Cut Chemist, for the Coachella Valley Music and Arts Festival and an international tour, primarily in the UK but also including dates in Ireland, Portugal, Spain, Japan and the United States. They played at Glastonbury in 2014 and had a Word of Mouth Reunion Tour during the Summer of 2014.

In 2016, they released their first new song in a decade "Customer Service".

In other media
Jurassic 5's music has been used in several video games. In 2000, "Jayou" was featured in Grind Session. Also in 2000, Jet Set Radio was released in North America including the track "Improvise" from the album Quality Control - though it only appears on the US pressing. All other pressings of the album have the track Concrete And Clay instead - and an instrumental version of the same song. The following year, the track "Great Expectations" from the same album was also included in Mat Hoffman's Pro BMX. In 2002, "What's Golden" was featured on ATV Offroad Fury 2. The song was additionally included in the video game Forza Horizon 3 on the fictional radio 'Block Party'. "A Day At The Races" featuring Big Daddy Kane appeared in the 2003 skateboarding game Tony Hawk's Underground. The song "In The House" from Feedback was featured in NBA Live 06. and "Work it Out" was in NBA Live 07, while "Red Hot" was featured in SSX on Tour. "Sum of Us" and "High Fidelity" from Power in Numbers was included in the 2019 game Trials Rising.

The group featured in the 2001 hip hop documentary Scratch.

They were also featured in online magazine, UrbanSouths elite list of underground hip hop albums.

Discography

Studio albums

Extended plays

Singles

Guest appearances

Music videos

References

External links

Official Interscope Records site
 

TVT Records artists
Hip hop groups from California
Alternative hip hop groups
Musical groups from Los Angeles
Musical groups established in 1993
Musical groups disestablished in 2007
Musical groups reestablished in 2013
Interscope Records artists
1993 establishments in California